MJ Morris is an American football quarterback for the NC State Wolfpack.

High school career
Morris attended Carrollton High School in Carrollton, Georgia for his freshman and sophomore year before transferring to Pace Academy in Atlanta, Georgia for his junior year before transferring back to Carrollton for his senior year. As a senior, he passed for 3,089 yards with 33 touchdowns. Morris committed to North Carolina State University to play college football.

College career
Morris entered his true freshman year at NC State in 2022 as backup to Devin Leary and Jack Chambers. He earned his first extensive playing time during the team's eighth game against Virginia Tech. Trailing 21–3, Morris replaced Chambers, completing 20 of 29 passes for 265 yards and three touchdowns in the victory.

References

External links
NC State Wolfpack bio

Living people
Players of American football from Georgia (U.S. state)
American football quarterbacks
NC State Wolfpack football players
Year of birth missing (living people)